This is a list of amateur radio organizations. It includes notable amateur radio international, national, regional, and local organizations.

International
 Amateur Radio Digital Communications - amateur radio and Internet protocol coordination and funding
 Amateur Radio Lighthouse Society - devoted to maritime communications, amateur radio, lighthouses, and lightships
 European Radio Amateurs' Organization (EURAO)
 International Amateur Radio Club
 International Amateur Radio Union (IARU) - League of National Societies of Amateur Radio.
 International League of Esperantist Radio Amateurs
 Quarter Century Wireless Association - an organization of amateur radio operators first licensed 25 or more years ago
 Radio Amateur Satellite Corporation (AMSAT) - Organization dedicated exclusively to amateur radio communications via artificial orbiting satellites
 Royal Naval Amateur Radio Society - a specialised group or club for amateur radio operators who have a link with maritime employment
 Tucson Amateur Packet Radio (TAPR) - Dedicated to packet radio, digital communications and digital technology in amateur radio including software-defined radio.
 Young Ladies Radio League

National organisations

Regional and local clubs

In Canada
Halifax Amateur Radio Club, founded in Halifax, Nova Scotia, in 1933, is one of Canada's oldest amateur radio clubs. Which is the largest amateur radio club in Nova Scotia, and one of the largest in Eastern Canada.

In India
JNA Wireless Association, one of the oldest amateur radio clubs in Mumbai.
Mangalore Amateur Radio Club, a group of ham radio enthusiasts in Mangaluru.
Mumbai Amateur Radio Society, a group of ham radio enthusiasts in Mumbai.

In Luxembourg
Association des Radioamateurs du Kayldall (ADRAD), a local organization based in Rumelange

In Portugal
Associacao de Radioamadores da Linha de Cascais, Cascais Local Radio Amateurs Association

In the United States
Amateur Radio Association at the University of Maryland maintains a fully stocked ham shack high atop the South Campus Dining Hall on the campus of the University of Maryland, College Park campus.
Frankford Radio Club, founded in Philadelphia in 1927.
South Jersey Radio Association
Texas DX Society

References

 
Amateur radio
Amateur radio-related lists